In Mandaeism, the ṣa is a rolled-up piece of sacramental flatbread that contains nuts and raisins, is also used in ritual meals for the dead and has a phallic symbolism. It is rolled up like a scroll.

It is distinct from the pihta and faṭira, which are flatbreads that are not rolled up.

The ṣa is also mentioned as the 'great first sindirka (male date-palm)' in the Scroll of the Great Baptism (line 139 f.).

See also
Sacramental bread
Pihta
Fatira

References

Flatbreads
Mandaean ceremonial food and drink
Mandaic words and phrases
Eucharistic objects
Unleavened breads